Stadtbühne Vohenstrauß was a theatre company that performed at the  in Leuchtenberg, Bavaria, Germany.

Theatre companies in Germany